The Enggano Island rat (Rattus enganus) is a species of rodent in the family Muridae.
It is found only on Enggano Island, Indonesia. It is critically endangered and has not been collected in more than a century, so is very possibly extinct.

References

Rattus
Mammals described in 1906
Taxonomy articles created by Polbot
Endemic fauna of Indonesia